Alexei Nikolaevich Ulanov (born 4 November 1947) is a retired pair skater who represented the Soviet Union. With Irina Rodnina, he is the 1972 Olympic champion and a four-time (1969–1972) world champion. With his then-wife Lyudmila Smirnova, he is a two-time world silver medalist.

Career
Ulanov began figure skating in 1954 and became a member of the USSR National Team in 1964. Rodnina / Ulanov began skating together in the 1960s and won several World and European Championships. They were coached by Stanislav Zhuk and trained at the Armed Forces sports society in Moscow. The culmination of their career was their 1972 Olympics win. By this point Ulanov had fallen in love with fellow skater Lyudmila Smirnova. Rodnina  and Ulanov separated, and Ulanov began skating with Smirnova.

Smirnova and Ulanov competed together for two seasons. They won silver medals at the 1973 World and European Championships. The next season, they won European bronze and world silver medals.

Ulanov was awarded the Order of the Red Banner of Labour in 1972.

Personal life
Ulanov and Smirnova married and later divorced after having two children, Nikolai Ulanov and Irina Ulanova. Irina became a pair skater, who skated with Alexander Smirnov and Maxim Trankov for about three years. Ulanov moved to the United States in 1995 and currently lives in South Florida.

Results

With Rodnina

With Smirnova

References

External links

Rodnina and Ulanov pair profile
Smirnova and Ulanov competition results

Navigation

1947 births
Living people
Figure skaters at the 1972 Winter Olympics
Olympic figure skaters of the Soviet Union
Soviet male pair skaters
Russian male pair skaters
Figure skaters from Moscow
Olympic gold medalists for the Soviet Union
Armed Forces sports society athletes
Olympic medalists in figure skating
World Figure Skating Championships medalists
European Figure Skating Championships medalists
Medalists at the 1972 Winter Olympics